Nizam Čančar (born 17 September 1975) is a Bosnian male Paralympic sitting volleyball player. He is part of the Bosnia and Herzegovina national team. He competed at the 2012 Summer Paralympics winning the gold medal. On club level he played for Oki Fantomi in 2012.

He also represented Croatia national sitting volleyball team at 2006 Roermond sitting volleyball World Championships, as he did not receive a call-up by Bosnia and Herzegovina national sitting volleyball team to the tournament. Bosnia won that edition of World Championships, defeating Iran in the final 3–1. He also represented Croatia as player during 2007 sitting volleyball European championships in Nyíregyháza. Croatia lost to Bosnia 0:3 in that edition. His teammate from hometown club Fantomi Ševko Nuhanović was the coach of Croatia in that tournament. Won three medals at the Paralympic Summer Games between 2012 and 2020.

See also
 Bosnia and Herzegovina at the 2012 Summer Paralympics

References

Further reading
 Paralympic.org
 Team Canada Men Nominated for Best Team of the London 2012 Paralympic Games
 Channel 4 Results

1975 births
Bosnia and Herzegovina men's sitting volleyball players
Volleyball players at the 2012 Summer Paralympics
Volleyball players at the 2016 Summer Paralympics
Paralympic volleyball players of Bosnia and Herzegovina
Medalists at the 2012 Summer Paralympics
Paralympic medalists in volleyball
Paralympic gold medalists for Bosnia and Herzegovina
Living people
Paralympic silver medalists for Bosnia and Herzegovina
Medalists at the 2016 Summer Paralympics